Empress Embedded Database is a relational database management system that has been embedded into applications, including medical systems, network routers, nuclear power plant monitors, satellite management systems. Empress is an ACID compliant relational database management system (RDBMS) with two-phase commit and several transaction isolation levels for real-time embedded applications. It supports both persistent and in-memory storage of data and works with text, binary, multimedia, as well as traditional data.

History
The first version of Empress was created by John Kornatowski and Ivor Ladd in 1979 and was originally named MISTRESS. It was based on research done on "MRS: A microcomputer database management system" at the University of Toronto, which was published by the Association for Computing Machinery in SIGSMALL SIGMOD 1981. The commercial version was one of the first available relational database management systems (RDBMS) and was named Empress. Its first customer ship was in early 1981. Empress was the first commercial database to be available on Linux. Its Linux release dates back to early 1995.

API and architecture
Empress supports many application programming interfaces in several programming languages. The C programming language has the most APIs including the low-level kernel MR Routines, Embedded SQL, MSCALL and ODBC. There are also APIs for C++ and JAVA. The layered architecture design provides levels of system optimization for application development. Applications developed using these APIs may be run in standalone and/or server modes.

Product features

 Kernel API
 SQL API
 Fast Bulk Data Handling (BLOBs)
 Bulk Chunks
 Unlimited Attributes
 File Indices
 Persistent Stored Modules
 Triggers
 Stored Procedures
 No Pre-Partitioning required
 Referential Constraints
 Range Checks
 Micro-Second Time Stamps
 Layered Architecture
 Text Search Index
 Spatial Search Index
 Cancel Functionality
 Hierarchical Query
 JDBC Interface
 C++ APIs
 Database Encryption
 64 BIT Operating System Versions
 UTF-8
 UNICODE & National Language Support
 Replication Server
 Time-out Function

Supported platforms
Empress runs on all major Android, Linux-, Real-Time- and Windows-supported platforms:
 Android
 BlueCat Linux
 Debian
 Fedora
 HP-UX
 AIX
 Linux
 LynxOS RTOS
 MontaVista Linux
 QNX Neutrino
 Red Hat Linux
 Solaris
 Suse Linux
 Ubuntu
 Unix
 VxWorks
 Windows CE
 Windows Mobile
 Windows XP
 Windows 7
 Wind River Linux

References

External links

Product Reviews: Empress RDBMS and Just Logic by Rob Wehrli

Data
Embedded databases